Joel Parker (January 25, 1795 – August 17, 1875) was an American jurist from New Hampshire.

Biography
He was born at Jaffrey, New Hampshire. He studied at Groton Academy, and later Dartmouth College, where he graduated in 1811. After studying law, he practiced at Keene. From 1824 to 1826, he was a member of the New Hampshire Legislature. He was appointed an associate justice of the New Hampshire Supreme Court in 1833 and became chief justice in 1838. In 1840 he was chairman of the committee on the revision of the New Hampshire statutes. From 1847 to 1857, he was professor of medical jurisprudence at Dartmouth. In 1847 he became a professor at the Harvard Law School, where he served until his death. Conservative in politics, he opposed during the American Civil War the exercise by President Abraham Lincoln of what he deemed unconstitutional powers.

Works
 Progress (Hanover, New Hampshire, 1840)
 Daniel Webster as a Jurist, an address to the Harvard Law School (Cambridge, Massachusetts, 1853)
 A Charge to the Grand Jury on the Uncertainty of Law (1854)
 Non-Extension of Slavery (1856)
 Personal Liberty Laws (1861)
 The Right of Secession (1861)
 Constitutional Law (1862)
 Habeas Corpus and Martial Law (Philadelphia, 1862)
 The War Powers of Congress and of the President (1863)
 Revolution and Reconstruction (1866)
 The Three Powers of Government (1869)
 Conflict of Decisions (1875)

Notes

References
 
 

1795 births
1875 deaths
People from Jaffrey, New Hampshire
Dartmouth College alumni
Dartmouth College faculty
Harvard Law School faculty
Chief Justices of the New Hampshire Supreme Court
Members of the New Hampshire General Court
19th-century American politicians
19th-century American judges